Samuel Mieses (November 1841 – January 1884) was a German chess master.

Uncle of Jacques Mieses, he studied medicine at the University of Breslau, and was one of chess pupils of Adolf Anderssen. He lost a match to him (0½–4½) in 1867, and was a frequent chess opponent of Johannes Zukertort and Jakob Rosanes in Breslau.

He won at Bad Ems 1871 and shared 1st with Anderssen but lost a play-off game to him at Leipzig 1871 (Kongresse des Mitteldeutschen Schachbundes, the first Middle German Chess Congress), He lost a match to Johannes von Minckwitz (3½–5½) at Leipzig 1872.

References

1841 births
1884 deaths
German chess players
19th-century chess players